The 2020–21 Georgia State Panthers men's basketball team represented Georgia State University during the 2020–21 NCAA Division I men's basketball season. The Panthers, led by second-year head coach Rob Lanier, played their home games at the GSU Sports Arena in Atlanta, Georgia as members of the Sun Belt Conference. With the creation of divisions to cut down on travel due to the COVID-19 pandemic, they played in the East Division.

Previous season 
The Panthers finished the season 19–13, 12–8 in Sun Belt play to finish in a tie for fourth place. They were the No. 4 seed in the Sun Belt tournament, where they lost to Georgia Southern.

Roster

Schedule and results

|-
!colspan=9 style=| Non-conference regular season

|-
!colspan=9 style=| Conference regular season

|-
!colspan=9 style=| Sun Belt tournament

References

Georgia State Panthers men's basketball seasons
Georgia State